Staples commonly refers to: 
Staple (fastener), a small strip of folded metal used to fasten sheets of paper together
Staples Inc., an office supply chain store with headquarters in North America
Staple foods

Staples may also refer to:

Places 
Staples Pond, a waterbody in Temple, Maine, United States
Staples, Minnesota, United States
Staples, Texas, United States

Other uses
Staples (name), a surname and list of people with the name
Staples (Amtrak station), a train station in Staples, Minnesota, United States
Staples (Canada), a subsidiary of Staples Inc.
Staples baronets, an extinct title in the Baronetage of Ireland
Staples Center, an arena in Los Angeles, California, United States
Staples Subdivision, a railway in Minnesota, United States
The Staple Singers, an American gospel, soul and R&B group
"Staples", a song by Relient K from their self-titled debut album

See also 
Staple (disambiguation)
Staples High School (disambiguation)
Staples thesis, a theory of Canadian economic development